Thalu is an Australian children's fantasy television series which was screened 2020 on ABC Me. The ten-part series focuses on a group of indigenous children who undertake a journey to save their country from the threat of a mysterious dust cloud and its inhabitants, the Takers.

Production
The series is filmed in the Pilbara region of Western Australia and the cast are from Roebourne. Each character has been written with input from the young cast member to reflect their personality, sense of humour and culture. The series was directed by Tyson Mowarin.

Cast
 Logan Adams as Noodles
 Cherry-Rose Hubert as Em
 Jakeile Coffin as Keile
 Sharliya Mowarin as Kali
 Ella Togo as Samara
 Wade Walker as Hudson
 Penny Wally as Vinka

Guests
 Elaine Crombie as Bits and Bobs
 Trevor Ryan as Jack In A Box 
 Gabriel Willie as Man Up A Tree
 Tootsie Daniel, Allery Sandy, Jean Churnside, Judith Coppin, Pansy Hicks, Pansy Sambo, Violet Samson as The Nannas
 Trisha Morton-Thomas  as The Principal
 Aaron McGrath as Random Dan
 Wendyl Alex as Big Joey
 Ashton Munda as Traditional Man
 Trevor Jamieson as The Shadow Boxer 
 Derik Lynch as The Trainer
 Maverick Eaton, Sidney Eaton, Fabian Togo, Tiras Walker as Boxers
 Hunter Page-Lochard as The Trapper
 Dave Johnson as The Nhuka
 Della Rae Morrison as Aunty 
 Tameeka Rassip-Andrews as Other Gang Girl
 Zack Levi as Other Gang Boy
 Leon Burchill, Billy McPherson as The Brothers

References

APRA Award winners
National Indigenous Television original programming
Australian Broadcasting Corporation original programming
2020 Australian television series debuts
Australian children's television series
Australian drama television series
Australian fantasy television series
English-language television shows
Television shows set in Australia